Spring Garden-Terra Verde is a census-designated place (CDP) in Nueces County, Texas, United States. The population was 693 at the 2000 census.

Spring Garden-Terra Verde CDP split into the Spring Gardens CDP and the Tierra Grande CDP for the 2010 census.

Geography
Spring Garden-Terra Verde is located at  (27.761568, -97.725473).

Demographics
As of the census of 2000, there were 693 people, 178 households, and 155 families residing in the CDP. The population density was 228.7 people per square mile (88.3/km2). There were 211 housing units at an average density of 69.6/sq mi (26.9/km2). The racial makeup of the CDP was 68.25% White, 0.43% African American, 0.72% Native American, 28.43% from other races, and 2.16% from two or more races. Hispanic or Latino of any race were 97.11% of the population.

There were 178 households, out of which 57.9% had children under the age of 18 living with them, 66.9% were married couples living together, 13.5% had a female householder with no husband present, and 12.4% were non-families. 11.2% of all households were made up of individuals, and 5.1% had someone living alone who was 65 years of age or older. The average household size was 3.89 and the average family size was 4.20.

In the CDP, the population was spread out, with 40.8% under the age of 18, 11.3% from 18 to 24, 29.0% from 25 to 44, 13.4% from 45 to 64, and 5.5% who were 65 years of age or older. The median age was 23 years. For every 100 females, there were 111.3 males. For every 100 females age 18 and over, there were 102.0 males.

The median income for a household in the CDP was $17,188, and the median income for a family was $17,396. Males had a median income of $22,574 versus $14,444 for females. The per capita income for the CDP was $5,223. About 56.6% of families and 68.0% of the population were below the poverty line, including 78.6% of those under age 18 and none of those age 65 or over.

Education
Spring Garden-Terra Verde is served by the Robstown Independent School District.

References

Census-designated places in Nueces County, Texas
Census-designated places in Texas
Corpus Christi metropolitan area